The Ballarat–Skipton Rail Trail in western Victoria, Australia, runs 53 kilometres along the old Skipton railway line from western Ballarat, southwest through Haddon, Smythesdale and Pittong to Skipton. The trail was in poor condition for many years before being upgraded and resurfaced in 2008, at a cost of $700,000, funded in roughly equal measure by local, state and federal government. The new surface is "compacted granitic sand". The total length of the trail is 63km including an 8km section from Ballarat railway station to the trailhead.

One major landmark on the route is the historic timber Nimmons Bridge at Newtown over which the trail passes.  An adjacent dirt road also permits a close inspection of the structure.

Landmarks 

 0km: Trail begins at Ballarat railway station.
 4.5km: Arch of Victory and Avenue of Honour. Trees commemorate Ballarat residents who enlisted in World War I between 1917 and 1919.
 7.6km: Rail trail proper starts.
 10.2km: Cardigan Station.
 17.8km: Haddon Station.
 25km: Smythesdale Station; Smythesdale was a former gold mining town.
 29.3km: Scarsdale Station.
 33.8km: New Town Station, Nimmons Bridge.
 36.5km: Ruins of another trestle bridge.
 42.3km: Historic township of Linton.
 50km: Pittong
 62.6km: Skipton Station.
 63km: Skipton

References

External links 
Bikely map
railtrails.org

Rail trails in Victoria (Australia)